Events in 1965 in Japanese television.

Debuts

Ongoing shows
Mighty Atom, anime (1963-1966)
Tetsujin 28-go, anime (1963-1966)
Phantom Agents, anime (1964-1966)
Hyokkori Hyō Tanjima, anime (1964-1969)
Music Fair, music (1964–present)

Endings

See also
1965 in anime
1965 in Japan
List of Japanese films of 1965

References